Sosnówka  is a village in the administrative district of Gmina Grudziądz, within Grudziądz County, Kuyavian-Pomeranian Voivodeship, in north-central Poland.

In 2005 the village had a population of 210.

References

Villages in Grudziądz County